Kristel Lisberg (born 6 December 1989 in Tórshavn), is a Faroese singer, songwriter and optometrist. She currently lives in Denmark where she rose to fame after participating in the Danish version of X Factor. In 2014 she released the single "Without You", and in 2015 the follow-up single "September". She participated in Dansk Melodi Grand Prix 2016, the Danish national selection for the Eurovision Song Contest with the song "Who Needs a Heart?".

Kristel started performing at an early age together with her father Jens Lisberg, who is a well-known Faroese country singer.

Discography

Extended plays 

 2003 – Ain't No Love

Singles 
2003 – "Ain't No Love"
2011 – "In the Lights"
2014 – "Without You"
2015 – "September"
2016 – "Who Needs a Heart"
2020 – "Contagious"
2020 – "I Only Want You"
2021 – "Stars in the Summer Night" (nebenGesjæft feat. Kristel Lisberg)
2022 – "It's Killing Me"

Honours 
2015 - Nominated for the Faroese Music Awards in the category Best female singer
2012 - Nominated for the Planet Awards in the category Best new artist/band

References

Living people
1989 births
21st-century Danish women singers
Danish pop singers
Faroese women singers
People from Tvøroyri
X Factor (Danish TV series) contestants
Dansk Melodi Grand Prix contestants
Faroese composers
Faroese songwriters
Optometrists